Henry Che-Chuen Yuen (Chinese: 袁子春; born 7 April 1948, in Shanghai, China) is a founder and former CEO of Gemstar-TV Guide International.   He has a PhD in applied mathematics from Caltech.  He worked briefly at Caltech and New York University, then obtained a law degree from Loyola Law School.
 
He founded Gemstar in 1986. He was called a "patent terrorist" for his aggressive litigation regarding the company's patent portfolio. 
After he merged Gemstar with TV Guide - he became notorious for constructing irrational and obscure business plans that had no relevance and relationship with the realities of the media business.
He was fired from Gemstar in 2003, after the company revealed criminal manipulation of revenue recognition initiated by Yuen and other accounting problems.  He was convicted of securities fraud in 2006, and ordered to pay $22 million in penalties .  As of April 25, 2007, his whereabouts are unknown.

References

External links
Early profile

American businesspeople
Loyola Law School alumni
California Institute of Technology alumni
New York University faculty
Chinese emigrants to the United States
Living people
1948 births
American businesspeople convicted of crimes